The Man Who Sold the Moon is the title of a 1950 collection of science fiction short stories by American writer Robert A. Heinlein.

The stories, part of Heinlein's Future History series, appear in the first edition as follows:

 Introduction by John W. Campbell, Jr., editor of Astounding Science Fiction
 Foreword by Robert A. Heinlein
 "Let There Be Light" (1940; originally published in Super Science Stories)
 "The Roads Must Roll" (1940; originally published in Astounding Science Fiction)
 "The Man Who Sold the Moon" (1950; first appearance is in this collection)
 "Requiem" (1940; originally published in Astounding Science Fiction)
 "Life-Line" (1939; originally published in Astounding Science Fiction)
 "Blowups Happen" (1940; originally published in Astounding Science Fiction)

Early paperback printings omitted "Life-Line" and "Blowups Happen", as well as Campbell's introduction.

Reception
Boucher and McComas praised the 1950 edition as Heinlein "at his superlative best". In his "Books" column for F&SF, Damon Knight selected The Man Who Sold the Moon as one of the 10 best science fiction books of the 1950s. P. Schuyler Miller said that "Heinlein is a master of concealed technology ... no other writer [has] worked out the scientific minutiae of his settings so fully or so unobtrusively", praising as well Heinlein's skill at crafting "the human engineering details of each situation".

References

Sources

External links

1950 short story collections
Short story collections by Robert A. Heinlein